Spectamen marsus, common name the streaked top shell, is a species of sea snail, a marine gastropod mollusk in the family Solariellidae.

Description
The size of the shell attains 5 mm.

Distribution
This marine species is endemic to Australia and occurs off South Australia and Western Australia.

References

 Cotton, B.C. & Godfrey, F.K. (1938) New species of South Australian Gastropoda. Records of the South Australian Museum, 6, 199–206, pl. 17.
 Cotton, B.C. 1959. South Australian Mollusca. Archaeogastropoda. Handbook of the Flora and Fauna of South Australia. Adelaide : South Australian Government Printer 449 pp
 Wilson, B. 1993. Australian Marine Shells. Prosobranch Gastropods. Kallaroo, Western Australia : Odyssey Publishing Vol. 1 408 pp.

External links
 World Register of Marine Species

marsus
Gastropods of Australia
Gastropods described in 1938